Milton Sobocinski (born 13 February 1934) is a Brazilian former sports shooter. He competed in the 50 metre rifle, three positions and the 50 metre rifle, prone events at the 1956 Summer Olympics.

References

1934 births
Living people
Brazilian male sport shooters
Olympic shooters of Brazil
Shooters at the 1956 Summer Olympics
Place of birth missing (living people)
Pan American Games medalists in shooting
Pan American Games bronze medalists for Brazil
Shooters at the 1963 Pan American Games
20th-century Brazilian people
21st-century Brazilian people